"Dear" is the thirty-third single by Japanese singer Mika Nakashima, released on April 27, 2011. It peaked at number 8 in the Oricon Weekly Singles Chart, and sold over 25,000 copies. In May 2011, the song was certified Gold by the RIAJ for digital downloads of over 100,000.

Background 
This single marked a comeback for Nakashima, who took a break from performing in October 2010 to seek treatment for her chronic Eustachian tube dysfunction. The title track was the theme song for the Japanese film Yōkame no Semi, in which Mao Inoue played the lead role.

For "Dear", Nakashima again collaborated with Katsuhiko Sugiyama, who wrote and composed her previous single, "Ichiban Kirei na Watashi o".

The coupling tune is a rearranged version of "A Miracle For You", a song from Nakashima's first album, True.

Track listing

Charts

Oricon Sales Chart (Japan)

References

2010 singles
Mika Nakashima songs
Japanese film songs
2010 songs
Songs written by Katsuhiko Sugiyama
Songs written by Mika Nakashima